Technobanine Point is the site of a proposed deepwater port in Mozambique near the capital Maputo.

Transport 

It would be connected by an 1100 km long railway line to coal mines in Botswana and also Zimbabwe.

See also 

 Railway stations in Mozambique
 Railway stations in Zimbabwe
 Railway stations in Botswana
 List of deepwater ports

References 

Maputo